Richard Michael Denton FRS (born 16 October 1941) is a British biochemist, and Emeritus Professor at University of Bristol.

Life
He earned a PhD in 1967 at the University of Cambridge, where he studied with Sir Philip Randle.

Works
Richard Michael Denton, C. I. Pogson, Metabolic regulation, Chapman and Hall, 1976, 
P. J. Randle, Richard Michael Denton, Hormones and cell metabolism, Oxford University Press, 1974,

References

British biochemists
Academics of the University of Bristol
People educated at Wycliffe College, Gloucestershire
Alumni of Christ's College, Cambridge
Fellows of the Royal Society
1941 births
Living people